Ioscytus politus is a species of shore bug in the family Saldidae. It is found in North America.

Subspecies
These two subspecies belong to the species Ioscytus politus:
 Ioscytus politus flavicosta Reuter, 1912
 Ioscytus politus politus (Uhler, 1877)

References

Articles created by Qbugbot
Insects described in 1877
Saldoidini